Lutaonella is a Gram-negative, aerobic, moderately thermophilic and non-motile genus of bacteria from the family of Flavobacteriaceae with one known species (Lutaonella thermophila). Lutaonella thermophila has been isolated from a hot spring from the coast of Green Island from Taiwan.

References

Flavobacteria
Bacteria genera
Monotypic bacteria genera
Taxa described in 2008